Whaingaroa may refer to:

 Ngāpuhi / Ngāti Kahu ki Whaingaroa, a Māori tribe
 Raglan, New Zealand, a town in Waikato

See also

 Whangaroa, an area in Northland, New Zealand
 Whangaroa Harbour, a harbour in Northland, New Zealand